Diogo Homem (1521–1576) was a Portuguese cartographer, son of Lopo Homem and member of a family of cartographers. 

Due to a crime of murder, in which he was connivent, he was forced to exile from Portugal, first in England, and then in Venice. It was there that he produced numerous manuscript atlases and charts, many of them of the Mediterranean. 

The work of Diogo Homem is of an exceptional graphical quality and beauty, being kept in Italy, Austria, United Kingdom, France, the USA and Portugal.

Portuguese cartographers
1521 births
1576 deaths
16th-century Portuguese people
16th-century cartographers